Seer Movie 5: Rise of Thunder is a 2015 Chinese animated children's adventure drama film directed by Zhangjun Wang. The film is part of the Seer film series, following Seer 4 (2014). The film was released on July 23, 2015.

Voice cast
Yuting Luo
Wei Zhai
Xiaotong Wang
Ye Sun
Lei Wu
Ke Jiang
Beichen Liu
Ye Li

Reception
The film earned  at the Chinese box office.

References

External links

2010s adventure films
2015 animated films
2015 films
Animated adventure films
Animated drama films
Chinese animated films
Chinese children's films
Animated films based on video games
2015 drama films